Scott Rosenberg (born April 24, 1963) is an American screenwriter, film producer, and actor.

Life and career 
Rosenberg was born in Needham, Massachusetts, to a Jewish family. After high school graduation in 1981, he attended Boston University, from which he received his bachelor's degree in 1985. He earned his MFA from UCLA. While at UCLA, he had entered a screenwriting contest, in which he came in third place, and as a result, signed with his first agent. His big break came when producer Joel Silver bought his script, "Love Lies Bleeding", and he wrote an episode for the television show, Tales from the Crypt. His screenwriting credits include major motion pictures such as Con Air and Gone in 60 Seconds.

During production of the film Domestic Disturbance  in April 2001, Rosenberg was arrested along with actor Vince Vaughn after a bar brawl in Wilmington, North Carolina. The scuffle broke out at the Firebelly Lounge, where actor Steve Buscemi had been stabbed in the face, throat, and arm.

On Beautiful Girls, 1996, starring Timothy Hutton, Matt Dillon, and Uma Thurman:It was the worst winter ever in this small hometown. Snow plows were coming by, and I was just tired of writing these movies with people getting shot and killed. So I said, 'There is more action going on in my hometown with my friends dealing with the fact that they can't deal with turning 30 or with commitment' – all that became Beautiful Girls.In October 2015, Rosenberg was brought in to rewrite Jumanji: Welcome to the Jungle with his writing partner Jeff Pinkner. In February 2018, Rosenberg, Pinkner and director Jake Kasdan were expected to return to the film's sequel.

Scott has two children, Bowie and Sawyer, with his partner Langley Perer.

Filmography

Film

Uncredited revisions
 Armageddon (1998)
 The General's Daughter (1999)
 Domestic Disturbance (2001)
 Spider-Man (2002)
 Runaway Jury (2003)
 Pain & Gain (2013)
 Kristy (2014)

Unproduced screenplays
The Black Ice (1992)
The Ten (1996)
Johnny Diamond (1997)
Bad Moon Rising (1997) - Later published as a graphic novel.
The Sentinel (2003) - Remake of the 1977 film of the same name.
Lets Get Harry (2003) - Remake of the 1986 film of the same name.
And So it Goes (2003)
Bit Players (2003)
The Dirty Dozen (2006) - Remake of the 1967 film of the same name.
Already Dead (2007)
The Hauntrepreneur (2011)
Grasshopper Jungle (2014)

Special thanks
 Wonderland (2003)
 Cloverfield (2008)
 Closing Time (2010) (Short film)

Acting roles

Television
TV movies

TV series

References

External links 

 The Dialogue: Learn from the Masters Interview 
 , with one catalog record (June 2022)
WARNING: As of June 2022, LC credits some works by this Scott Rosenberg to the journalist Scott Rosenberg, born 1959. See the journalist  at LC; similarly at WorldCat. 

 

1963 births
20th-century American male actors
20th-century American male writers
20th-century American screenwriters
21st-century American male actors
21st-century American male writers
21st-century American screenwriters
American male film actors
American male screenwriters
American male television actors
Boston University College of Communication alumni
Film producers from Massachusetts
Living people
Male actors from Massachusetts
People from Needham, Massachusetts
Screenwriters from Massachusetts
UCLA Film School alumni